Gulmira Rainbekovna Karimova (13 August 1977 – 27 January 2023) was a Kazakh schoolteacher and politician. An independent, she served in the Senate from 25 to 27 January 2023. Chairman of the Committee of preschool and secondary education of the Ministry of Education and Science of the Republic of Kazakhstan (2021-2023).

Karimova died suddenly in Astana on 27 January 2023, at the age of 45.

Career 
She was born on August 13, 1977, in Petropavlovsk.

She graduated in 1998 from the North Kazakhstan State University majoring in "Teacher of primary classes", in 2008 - Kokshetau University majoring in "Bachelor of Finance", in 2016 - master's degree in "Pedagogical Education" at the Omsk State Pedagogical University.

1998-2001 - elementary school teacher at the "City Classical Gymnasium" (Petropavlovsk).

From 2001-2002 she was a primary school teacher at "Secondary school" in Petropavlovsk. - 2001-2002 - teacher of primary classes in the GU "Secondary school № 20" (Petropavlovsk).

2002-2004 Elementary school teacher in the "Al-Farabi School-Lyceum" (Petropavlovsk).

2004-2006 - Deputy principal of elementary classes in Al-Farabi school-lyceum (Petropavlovsk, Russia). - 2004-2006 - deputy director for primary classes in the SI "Al-Farabi School-Lyceum" (Petropavlovsk).

2006-2010 - deputy director on profile training at the SI "Al-Farabi School-Lyceum" (Petropavlovsk).

2010-2013 - Director of SE "Secondary School-Complex of National Revival #17" (Petropavlovsk).

September 2013 - July 2017 - Head of the State Institution "Education Department of Petropavlovsk".

July 2017 - September 2021 - Head of the Department of Education of the North Kazakhstan region.

September 2021 - January 16, 2023 - Chairman of the Committee of preschool and secondary education of the Ministry of Education and Science of the Republic of Kazakhstan.

On January 14, 2023, Gulmira Karimova was elected as a member of the Senate from the North Kazakhstan region. On January 25, the Central Election Commission of Kazakhstan registered Karimova as an elected member of the Senate. She died on January 26, 2023, in Astana.

References

1977 births
2023 deaths
Schoolteachers
Members of the Senate of Kazakhstan
People from Petropavl
21st-century Kazakhstani politicians
21st-century Kazakhstani women politicians